Hasegawa Katsutoshi (born 20 July 1944) is a former sumo wrestler from Kurisawa, Hokkaido, Japan (now a part of Iwamizawa city). He began his professional career in 1960, reaching the top division in 1965. He won eight special prizes for his achievements in tournaments and earned nine gold stars for defeating yokozuna. He won a tournament championship or yūshō in 1972 and was a runner-up in two other tournaments. His highest rank was sekiwake. He retired in 1976 and became an elder of the Japan Sumo Association, working as a coach at Sadogatake stable until his retirement in 2009.

Career
Hasegawa joined professional sumo in March 1960 at the age of 15, recruited by the former sekiwake Kotonishiki.  Unusually, he fought under his own surname for his entire career (he is the only top division wrestler from Sadogatake stable not to have adopted a shikona or fighting name with the prefix "Koto"). He made the jūryō division in January 1963 and was promoted to the top makuuchi division two years later in January 1965.

Hasegawa quickly rose up the ranks, defeating his first yokozuna (Tochinoumi) in September 1965 and earning his first special prize, for Technique. In the following tournament in November he made his debut in the titled san'yaku ranks at komusubi. He was runner-up to yokozuna Taihō in the May 1967 tournament. He reached sekiwake for the first time in January 1969 and held the rank for eight straight tournaments.

He won the top division yūshō or tournament championship at sekiwake rank in March 1972, defeating Kaiketsu in a playoff. However, the Sumo Association decided not to promote him, as there were already four ōzeki at that time, who were generally felt to be performing at a mediocre level. Managing only eight wins in the following tournament in May, he never became an ōzeki. He was a sekiwake for 21 tournaments, a record for the modern era which stood until 2007 when it was broken by Kotomitsuki.  His last appearance at sekiwake was in January 1974. After this tournament he changed the second part of his shikona from Katsutoshi to Katsuhiro but it did not bring a change of luck and he remained largely in the maegashira ranks.

Retirement from sumo
Hasegawa retired in May 1976, but remained in the sumo world as an elder, with the name Hidenoyama Oyakata. Until 2008 he was a Director of the Japan Sumo Association, responsible for the running of the annual honbasho held in Nagoya. He then worked at Special Executive level. Unusually for a senior member of the Association, he did not take charge of a stable, instead working as a coach at Sadogatake stable, firstly under former yokozuna Kotozakura, and from 2005 under former sekiwake Kotonowaka. He reached the mandatory retirement age of 65 in July 2009.

Fighting style
Hasegawa's favoured techniques were hidari-yotsu (a right hand outside, left hand inside grip on the opponent's mawashi), sukuinage (scoop throw), and yorikiri (force out).

Career record

See also
List of sumo record holders
List of sumo tournament top division champions
List of sumo tournament top division runners-up
List of sumo tournament second division champions
Glossary of sumo terms
List of past sumo wrestlers
List of sekiwake

References

1944 births
Living people
Japanese sumo wrestlers
Sumo people from Hokkaido
Sekiwake
Sumo wrestlers who use their birth name
People from Iwamizawa, Hokkaido
Sadogatake stable sumo wrestlers